A list of films produced in Hong Kong in 1959:.

1959

References

External links
 IMDB list of Hong Kong films
 Hong Kong films of 1959 at HKcinemamagic.com

1960
Lists of 1959 films by country or language
Films